The 1934 United States Senate election in Maine was held on September 10, 1934. 

Incumbent Republican Senator Frederick Hale was narrowly re-elected to a fourth term in office over Democratic Waterville mayor F. Harold Dubord.

Republican primary

Candidates
 Frederick Hale, incumbent Senator since 1917
 Louis A. Jack, former State Representative from Lisbon and President of the Maine Board of Trade

Results

Democratic primary

Candidates
 F. Harold Dubord, former Mayor of Waterville (1928–32)
 Clinton C. Stevens
 Paul C. Thurston

Results

General election

Results

See also 
 1934 United States Senate elections

References 

1934
Maine
United States Senate